Drug class may refer to:

 Drug class, a chemical or pharmacological classification of drugs

Drug class may also refer to category of legal restriction:
 Drugs controlled by the UK Misuse of Drugs Act, the United Kingdom legal classification
 Classes of drugs in the Controlled Substances Act in the United States are called "schedules"

See also
 Drug classification: making a hash of it?, a report on the Misuse of Drugs Act